Shruti Dhawan (born 28 March 1982) is an Indian former professional tennis player.

Dhawan has a career-high singles ranking by the WTA of 454, achieved on 30 July 2001. She also has a career-high WTA doubles ranking of 429, achieved on 20 October 2003. She won two singles and eight doubles titles on the ITF Women's Circuit.

Playing for India Fed Cup team, Dhawan has a win–loss record of 0–2.

ITF finals

Singles: 7 (2–5)

Doubles: 18 (8–10)

References

External links
 
 

1982 births
Living people
Indian female tennis players
Racket sportspeople from Delhi
Sportswomen from Delhi
21st-century Indian women